The yellow-haired hill rat (Bunomys chrysocomus) is a species of rodent in the family Muridae.
It is found only in Sulawesi, Indonesia, including Lore Lindu National Park.

References

Bunomys
Rodents of Sulawesi
Mammals described in 1887
Taxonomy articles created by Polbot